Alqama ibn Qays al-Nakha'i (d.  was a well-known scholar from among the taba'een and pupil of Abd-Allah ibn Mas'ud, who called him the most erudite of his disciples. He also related traditions from Ali ibn Abi Talib, Sa'd ibn Abi Waqqas (Sa`d ibn Malik) and `Uthman.

Alqama is the founder of the School of Kufa in Islamic religious sciences. He followed in the footsteps of Ibn Mas‘ud in praying and conduct, in practising Islam as a whole. Amr ibn Shurahbil al-Sha'bi, who was among the scholars who narrated ahadith from Alqama, frequently suggested to those near him: ‘Come and let us go to the one who resembles Ibn Mas‘ud the most in conduct and attitudes.’ His major student was Ibrahim al-Nakha'i, a faqih from Kufa

Imam Abu Hanifa, who is generally accepted as one of the greatest of Muslim jurists, admired Alqama so much that he used to comment: ‘Alqama is probably more profound in (knowledge) of hadith and fiqh than some Companions.’

Early Islam scholars

Notes

External links
https://web.archive.org/web/20060822131327/http://www.islambyquestions.org/sunna/generations.htm

Tabi‘un
Tabi‘un hadith narrators
682 deaths
7th-century Arabs
Year of birth unknown
7th-century Arabic writers